Dr. Marc J. Susser is a former historian of the United States Department of State. The Office of the Historian of the Department of State is responsible, by act of the United States Congress, for the publication of the official historical record of United States foreign policy.  This is done via the Foreign Relations Series series of books.

Susser has a Ph.D. from Harvard University.  He became the historian in January 2001.

References

External links

Living people
United States Department of State officials
Harvard University alumni
21st-century American historians
21st-century American male writers
Year of birth missing (living people)
American male non-fiction writers